The Spirit Level  is a 1996 poetry collection written by Seamus Heaney, who received the 1995 Nobel Prize in Literature. It won the poetry prize for the 1996 Whitbread Awards.

Heaney has been recorded reading this collection on the Seamus Heaney Collected Poems album.

Contents 

 The Rain Stick
 To a Dutch Potter in Ireland 1.
 To a Dutch Potter in Ireland 2. After Liberation
 A Brigid's Girdle
 Mint
 A Sofa in the Forties
 Keeping Going
 Two Lorries
 Damson
 Weighing In
 St Kevin and the Blackbird
 The Flight Path 1
 The Flight Path 2
 The Flight Path 3
 The Flight Path 4
 The Flight Path 5
 The Flight Path 6
 An Invocation
 Mycenae Lookout 1. The Watchman's War
 Mycenae Lookout 2. Cassandra
 Mycenae Lookout 3. His Dawn Vision
 Mycenae Lookout 4. The Nights
 Mycenae Lookout 5. The Reverie of Water
 The First Words
 The Gravel Walks
 Whitby-sur-Moyola
 The Thimble
 The Butter-Print
 Remembered Columns
 'Poet's Chair'
 The Swing
 The Poplar
 Two Stick Drawings (1)
 Two Stick Drawings (2)
 A Call
 The Errand
 A Dog Was Crying Tonight in Wicklow Also
 M.
 An Architect
 The Sharping Stone
 The Strand
 The Walk
 At the Wellhead
 At Banagher
 Tollund
 Postscript

Notes

1996 poetry books
Costa Book Award-winning works
Irish poetry collections
Poetry by Seamus Heaney
Faber and Faber books